Anguilla bengalensis labiata, the African mottled eel, is a subspecies of eel in the genus Anguilla of the family Anguillidae.
 
Showing the typical characteristics of the Anguillidae, this species grows to 1.75 m and as much as 20 kg. The adult diet consists of crabs, frogs, and insects, as well as fish. It is found in east Africa: Lake Kariba, middle Zambezi, Pungwe, and Buzi systems, Upper and Lower Save/Rhunde system, Umzingwani and Limpopo Rivers. The dorsal side of the fish is mottled yellow olive, the ventral surface lighter; adults are less obviously mottled than the juveniles.

References

Anguillidae
Fish of Africa
Taxa named by Wilhelm Peters